Collective redress is a legal term used within the European Union to define the legal instrument of group proceedings as there is absolutely no regulation at the moment. At the present the European Commission is working on a study to introduce European class action, similar to the US class action.

Background
The project is currently at the stage of obtaining expert report and opinion. A survey carried out by the Commission showed that more than 79% of EU consumers would exercise their rights with other claimants in the event of joint proceedings. The possibility of group action would enable inexpensive legal action and would also act as deterrent. The Commission has declared that it will not be copying the US system, will avoid abusive and excessive practices and will take account of the 27 legal systems of member states that have developed over time. The instrument of class action will not confer any new rights or create new claims but will only provide new ways of asserting these. Some European states already have proceedings which are similar to class action, others have introduced compromises, such as legal action taken by associations, although most EU member states do not have any such instruments.

Further reading

References

External links
EuropeInvestControl
Collective Redress on Europa

European Union legal terminology